Kharagpur Junction railway station  is a railway station in Kharagpur of Paschim Medinipur district in the Indian state of West Bengal. It is also the fourth longest railway station by platform length after Hubli Junction railway station, Gorakhpur Junction railway station and Kollam Junction railway station. It is an A-1 category station of Indian Railways.

History
Kharagpur Junction came up in 1898–99. On one side, Bengal Nagpur Railway's Kharagpur–Cuttack line was opened on New Year's Day in 1899. On the other hand, the opening of the bridge over the Rupnarayan River at Kolaghat, on 19 April 1900, connected  with Kharagpur. Kharagpur was also linked with Sini the same year. The line was ready in 1898–99. The Kharagpur–Midnapore branch line was opened to traffic in 1901.

Infrastructure
Remodelling of Gorakhpur railway station was completed and the new platform inaugurated on 6 October 2013. Till then Kharagpur held the distinction of having the longest platform in the world for many years. Kharagpur also has the Asia's largest Railway Solid State Interlocking (SSI) system.

Platform nos. 1 and 3, and 2 and 4 of Kharagpur Junction are continuous. The 24-coach Coromandel Express stops at the start of platform no. 3 and its tail extends some distance into platform no. 1. Aloo Khasa is one of the famous dish found at the Kharagpur railway platform.

Background
It is the busiest junction station in South Eastern Railway Zone after Howrah. Hence, it is termed as Gateway to South Eastern Railway. It is one of the fifty highest railway reservation in India. It is a junction which connects Howrah to Mumbai, Chennai, Adra/Purulia and New Delhi via Tatanagar as well. It also connects Bhubaneshwar to New Delhi. Everyday approximately 275 trains pass through this station which includes freight traffic. In terms of passenger traffic it handles 176 trains on a daily basis. So, in a bid to decongest Kharagpur station and speed up locomotives, South Eastern Railway has decided to develop Hijli (close to IIT Kharagpur) as an alternative station for Kharagpur. Now most of the new trains coming from Balasore side and going towards Adra or Tatanagar stop at Hijli and bypass Kharagpur.

The Howrah–Nagpur–Mumbai line is classified under Route A of Indian Railways which allows trains to run at maximum permissible speed of 160 km/hr. However, as a result of the automated block section between Howrah and Kharagpur, the speed is restricted to 130 km/hr. The Howrah–Kharagpur section has been identified as one of the high-density automatic block signaling routes on Indian Railways. Thus plans are to deploy Train Protection & Warning System (TPWS) on this section to mitigate the risk of signal passed at danger (SPAD) by loco pilots leading to accidents.

Gallery

References

External links

 Kharagpur Railway Division
 Indian Institute of Technology, Kharagpur
 Kharagpur Municipality
 

Railway stations in Paschim Medinipur district
Railway junction stations in West Bengal
Kharagpur railway division
Kolkata Suburban Railway stations
Transport in Kharagpur
Indian Railway A1 Category Stations